Solute carrier family 2, facilitated glucose transporter member 12 is a protein that in humans is encoded by the SLC2A12 gene.

See also
 Glucose transporter
 Solute carrier family

References

Further reading

Solute carrier family